ELOT 927 is 7-bit character set standardized by ELOT, the Hellenic Organization for Standardization (HOS). It is also known as ISO-IR-88, CSISO88GREEK7 or 7-bit DEC Greek. The standard was withdrawn in November 1986. Support for it was implemented in various dot matrix printers (for example by Fujitsu) and line printers (for example by Printronix and Siemens) as well as in computer terminals (for example by DEC). Support for it can still be found in various applications, languages and protocols today, for example in Perl and Kermit.

Character set

See also 
ISO/IEC 646
ELOT 928

References 

Character sets